The Workers' Defense Committee (KOR) was a Polish civil society group that was established to give aid to prisoners and their families after the June 1976 protests and ensuing government crackdown. KOR was an example of successful social organizing based on specific issues relevant to the public's daily lives. It was a precursor and inspiration for efforts of the Solidarity trade union a few years later.

It was established in September 1976. A year later it was reorganized into the Committee for Social Self-defence KOR (Komitet Samoobrony Społecznej KOR).

History
This organization was the first major anti-communist civic group in Poland, as well as Eastern Europe. It was born of the outrage at the government's crackdown on the June 1976 protests. Its stated purpose was to create "new centers of autonomous activity." It raised money through sales of its underground publications, through fund-raising groups in Paris and London, and grants from Western institutions. 
                                                                            
KOR sent open letters of protest to the government and organized legal and financial support for the families of political detainees.  The leaders of the organization established an activities and coordination center and offered analysis on workers’ conditions within Poland. They often collaborated with Western journalists on writing and publishing articles.  The group worked with sympathetic lawyers to get better representation for striking workers and obtained medical diagnoses from doctors which they presented as evidence of police brutality in court trials.  The group smuggled in mimeograph machines to print its underground newsletter, Komunikat, which had a circulation of around 20,000 by 1978.

As a side project of KOR, an underground publishing house called NOWA was founded using mimeograph machines owned by KOR.  It printed material critical of the regime and reproduced banned writings from thinkers outside of the Warsaw Pact countries, such as George Orwell.  NOWA had its own print shops, storehouses, and distribution network, and financed itself through sales and contributions.

In the fall of 1977 KOR collaborated with Warsaw intellectuals to establish the Flying University, a series of lectures organized by unofficial student groups to discuss ideas about freedom that could not be debated in public.  The government harassed KOR members as it did other civil society groups in Poland: beating up and jailing dissidents, infiltrating and interrupting lectures, and conducting searches of dissidents’ houses.

However, KOR became an inspiration for the nation as its efforts finally paid off when the Polish government declared an amnesty for jailed strikers in the spring of 1977. In that year, it was renamed the Committee for Social Self-defence KOR (Komitet Samoobrony Społecznej KOR).

KOR went on to publish another underground paper, Robotnik ("The Worker"—the same title as Józef Piłsudski's underground paper)

Founding members
Jerzy Andrzejewski
Stanisław Barańczak
Ludwik Cohn
Jacek Kuroń
Edward Lipiński
Jan Józef Lipski
Antoni Macierewicz
Piotr Naimski
Antoni Pajdak
Józef Rybicki
Aniela Steinsbergowa
Adam Szczypiorski
Fr. Jan Zieja
Wojciech Ziembiński

See also 
 Movement for Defense of Human and Civic Rights (ROPCiO)
 Jan Krzysztof Kelus
 Committee for the Defense of the Unjustly Prosecuted - similar movement in Czechoslovakia

References

External links 
PBS: A Force More Powerful

1976 establishments in Poland
Anti-communism in Poland
Nonviolent resistance movements
Organizations established in 1976
Organizations disestablished in 1977
Solidarity (Polish trade union)